The 17009 / 10 Bidar - Hyderabad Deccan Intercity Express is an Express train belonging to Indian Railways South Central Railway zone that runs between  and  /  in India.

Coaches
The 17009 / 10 Bidar - Hyderabad Deccan Intercity Express has 18 general unreserved & two SLR (seating with luggage rake) coaches . It does not carry a pantry car coach.

As is customary with most train services in India, coach composition may be amended at the discretion of Indian Railways depending on demand.

Service

Routing

Traction
As the route is going to electrification, a Moula Ali based WDM-3D diesel locomotive pulls the train to its destination.

References

External links
17009 Intercity Express at India Rail Info
17010 Intercity Express at India Rail Info

Intercity Express (Indian Railways) trains
Transport in Bidar
Rail transport in Karnataka
Rail transport in Telangana
Transport in Hyderabad, India